Bernard Russ (born November 4, 1973) is a former American football linebacker. He played for the New England Patriots from 1997 to 1999, the New York/New Jersey Hitmen in 2001 and for the Saskatchewan Roughriders in 2002.

References

1973 births
Living people
American football linebackers
West Virginia Mountaineers football players
New England Patriots players
Scottish Claymores players
New York/New Jersey Hitmen players
Saskatchewan Roughriders players
Sportspeople from Utica, New York
Players of American football from New York (state)
American players of Canadian football